Ust-Tsilma (Ćilimdïn) is a rural locality (a selo) and the administrative center of Ust-Tsilemsky District of the Komi Republic, Russia, located where the Tsilma River enters the Pechora River. Population:

Transportation
It is served by the Ust-Tsilma Airport.

Climate
Ust-Tsilma has a subarctic climate (Köppen climate classification Dfc). Precipitation is moderate and is somewhat higher in summer than at other times of the year.

References

Rural localities in the Komi Republic
Pechorsky Uyezd